Bryan Glazer (born October 27, 1964) is an American businessman. Together with his brothers, Joel Glazer and Edward Glazer, he owns part of the First Allied Corporation, the Tampa Bay Buccaneers National Football League (NFL) franchise, and the English football club Manchester United. His family is based in Florida.

Early life and education
Glazer was born to Linda and Malcolm Glazer, American businessman and billionaire. Glazer received a bachelor's degree from American University in Washington, D.C. He majored in broadcast communications and was a leader of the Phi Sigma Kappa fraternity. He then received a Juris Doctor degree from the Whittier Law School located in Southern California.

Career
Glazer is currently executive vice-president of the Tampa Bay Buccaneers and was appointed to that position in 1995. He was a key player in the design, development and construction of the Bucs new stadium. He also helped in re-designing the franchise logo.  Under Glazer family ownership, the Buccaneers have two Super Bowl titles (XXXVII and LV - which was the first time a Super Bowl team played in its home stadium).

Glazer was appointed a director of Zapata Corporation in 1997, and served in that position until his retirement in 2009.

Glazer is currently a non-executive director of the Manchester United board, appointed by his father, Malcolm Glazer to replace the resigned members. Along with Andy Anson (Manchester United's commercial director) and Jeffrey Ajluni (Tampa Bay Buccaneers director of marketing and business development), Glazer was a key player in signing American International Group (AIG) as the club's new shirt sponsor for the 2006–07 season.

Philanthropy
In 2016, Glazer donated $4 million to the renovation and conversion of the Fort Homer W. Hesterly Armory into the Bryan Glazer Family Jewish Community Center.

See also
Glazer ownership of Manchester United

References

1964 births
Living people
American people of Lithuanian-Jewish descent
American soccer chairmen and investors
American sports businesspeople
American University School of Communication alumni
Manchester United F.C. directors and chairmen
Tampa Bay Buccaneers executives
Whittier Law School alumni
Glazer family
American billionaires
Jewish American sportspeople
21st-century American Jews